Ulrich Wolfgang Arndt FRS (23 April 1924 – 24 March 2006) was a scientist committed to the development of X-ray crystallography technology and instrumentation. His instruments were used to achieve data for some of the first solved protein structures, myoglobin and haemoglobin.

Born in Berlin, he emigrated with his family to London in the 1930s. He attended Emmanuel College, Cambridge, which lead to a research position in the Department of Crystallography in the Cavendish Laboratory. He then gained his PhD from Birmingham University with work on a Geiger counter spectrometer.

From Birmingham he moved to London in 1950 for a position in the Davy–Faraday Laboratory at the Royal Institution, where work began on protein structural determination. Sir Lawrence Bragg would become Director of the laboratory in 1954.  

His work continued at Cambridge in 1962, when he joined the new MRC Laboratory of Molecular Biology, invited by Max Perutz.

He was elected Fellow of the Royal Society in 1982, and he received the British Crystallographic Association’s Dorothy Hodgkin Prize in 2000.

References

1924 births
2006 deaths
Alumni of Emmanuel College, Cambridge
Alumni of the University of Birmingham
Scientists from Berlin
Crystallographers
Fellows of the Royal Society